Nagusta is a genus of Murder bugs in the family Reduviidae.

Species
Species within this genus include:

 Nagusta aethiopica  Villiers, 1967 
 Nagusta albata  Distant, 1903 
 Nagusta atlantis  (Miller, 1956) 
 Nagusta burgeoni Schouteden, 1952 
 Nagusta calamobata  Breddin, 1903 
 Nagusta carayoni  Villiers, 1949 
 Nagusta decorsei  Villiers, 1951 
 Nagusta dubia  Villiers, 1966 
 Nagusta gigas  Schouteden, 1952 
 Nagusta goedelii  (Kolenati, 1857) 
 Nagusta gracilis  (Varela, 1905) 
 Nagusta ivondroensis  Villiers, 1951 
 Nagusta junodi  Montandon, 1892 
 Nagusta leopoldi  (Schouteden, 1929) 
 Nagusta macroloba  Bergroth, 1907 
 Nagusta maura  Distant, 1913 
 Nagusta mirei  Villiers, 1967 
 Nagusta nigerensis  Villiers, 1948 
 Nagusta nigrina  Villiers, 1963 
 Nagusta praecatoria  (Fabricius, 1794) 
 Nagusta pretoriae  Miller, 1956 
 Nagusta pruinosa  Villiers, 1948 
 Nagusta punctaticollis  Stål, 1865 
 Nagusta ruindica  Schouteden, 1944 
 Nagusta rutshurica  Schouteden, 1944 
 Nagusta saegeri  (Villiers, 1932) 
 Nagusta schmitzi  Villiers, 1967 
 Nagusta schoutedeni  Villiers, 1967 
 Nagusta sigwalti  Villiers, 1959 
 Nagusta simonis  Puton, 1890 
 Nagusta simplex  Bergroth, 1907 
 Nagusta singalensis  Distant, 1909 
 Nagusta subflava  Distant, 1903 
 Nagusta synavei  Villiers, 1973 
 Nagusta tinantae  Villiers, 1932 
 Nagusta tuberosa  Stål, 1874 
 Nagusta uluguruensis  Villiers, 1962

References

External links

Reduviidae
Heteroptera genera